Hilda (also known as Hildafolk) is a British children's graphic novel series written and illustrated by Luke Pearson and published by Nobrow Press. A television series adaptation was released on Netflix on 21 September 2018. Following the success of the Netflix series, several story book tie-ins were published.

Content 

The graphic novels are set in a fantastic world resembling a late 20th century Scandinavia. They draw inspiration from Scandinavian folklore and the Moomins. The titular character is a small girl, who in the first two books lives with her mother in a cottage on a plain surrounded by mountains and forests, but later moves to the city Trolberg. Hilda's world is inhabited by regular people as well as fantastical creatures like trolls, giants, elves and spirits. In the fourth book, Hilda joins Trolberg's Sparrow Scouts.

Main characters 

 Hilda -  The main heroine, a headstrong, smart, kind and curious girl, keen on exploring the world around her with an open mind. Even though she interacts with her classmates and fellow scouts, she mostly keeps to herself, preferring to explore and make friends with fantastical creatures.
 Twig – Hilda's faithful pet deerfox (half deer, half fox).
 Johanna – Hilda's mother is caring and supportive, but often worries for her daughter. In her youth she was a Sparrow Scout, a fictional Trolberg equivalent to scouting groups.

Publication history

The Hilda graphic novels were released in locally translated versions in several other countries, including France, Germany, Italy, Spain, Poland, Sweden, Norway, Czech Republic, Serbia, Croatia and Russia.

In a 2019 interview, Luke Pearson stated that *Hilda and the Mountain King* would be the last volume in the original series and that he would be working on other graphic novel projects in the future.

Reception and awards

Critical reception 

The series was highly praised by critics and fans alike. The New York Times review by Pamela Paul of the volume Hilda and the Bird Parade draws comparisons between Pearson's fantastic worlds and the creations of Hayao Miyazaki, further stating: "In Hilda’s world, daytime is drawn in burnt orange, maroon and drab olive, and the night is an icy, eerie wash of dark teal and minty blue. Each landscape contains its own tantalizing visions." Alexandra Lange's article about the whole series for The New Yorker also stresses the similarities with Miyazaki's works and talks about the complexity of Pearson's creations and their appeal to kids and adults alike: “Pearson’s aesthetic is sophisticated for the often candy-colored world of children’s animation, and the plots fit neatly into a number of present-day parenting preoccupations.”

In July 2013, Hilda and the Midnight Giant was featured in The Best 7 Books for Young Readers list released by Deutschlandfunk, the German public radio. Hilda and the Midnight Giant was also nominated in The Cartoonist Studio Prize for Best Graphic Novel of the Year: 2012 Shortlist in Slate's The Cartoonist Studio Prize in 2013. The same year in November Hilda and the Bird Parade was included in the list of Notable Children’s Books of 2013 by The New York Times.

Awards and nominations

TV adaptation 

The TV production and licensing company Silvergate Media launched an animated series based on the graphic novels exclusively on Netflix on 21 September 2018 to widespread acclaim. The series' second season was released on 14 December 2020, and a feature film adaptation of Hilda and the Mountain King was released on 30 December 2021. The series has also inspired other media including a mobile app and several tie-in novels.

References

External links 
 The Hilda series at LibraryThing
 The Hilda series at GoodReads
 The Hilda series at Luke Pearson’s personal website
 The Hilda Series on Nobrow.net

Hilda
Book series introduced in 2010
2010 comics debuts
2010s graphic novels
British comics
British graphic novels
Fantasy comics
Fantasy graphic novels
Comics adapted into television series
Comics adapted into animated series
British comics adapted into films
Comics characters introduced in 2010